Win Zaw (born 12 May 1982) is a Burmese politician and painter who currently serves as a House of Nationalities member of parliament for Kachin State № 7 constituency. He is a member of the National League for Democracy.

Early life and education 
Win Zaw was born in Nantmon Village, Mohnyin Township, Kachin State on 12 May 1982. He graduated with B.A (Painting), PGDA-Painting from Mandalay University. He worked as a painter for his living.

References

1982 births
Living people
People from Kachin State
Members of the House of Nationalities
National League for Democracy politicians
Burmese painters
Mandalay University alumni